The franklin (Fr) or statcoulomb (statC) electrostatic unit of charge (esu) is the physical unit for electrical charge used in the cgs-esu and Gaussian units. It is a derived unit given by
 1 statC = 1 dyn1/2⋅cm = 1 cm3/2⋅g1/2⋅s−1.

That is, it is defined so that the Coulomb constant becomes a dimensionless quantity equal to 1.

It can be converted using
 1 newton = 105 dyne
 1 cm = 10−2 m

The SI system of units uses the coulomb (C) instead. The conversion between C and statC is different in different contexts. The most common contexts are:

 For electric charge: 
 1 C ≘  ≈ 
 ⇒ 1 statC ≘ ~.
 For electric flux (ΦD): 
 1 C ≘ 4π ×  ≈ 
 ⇒ 1 statC ≘ ~.

The symbol "≘" ('corresponds to') is used instead of "=" because the two sides are not interchangeable, as discussed below. The number  is 10 times the numeric value of the speed of light expressed in meters/second, and the conversions are exact except where indicated.  The second context implies that the SI and cgs units for an electric displacement field (D) are related by:

 1 C/m2 ≘ 4π ×  ≈ 
 ⇒ 1 statC/cm2 ≘ ~

due to the relation between the metre and the centimetre.  The coulomb is an extremely large charge rarely encountered in electrostatics, while the statcoulomb is closer to everyday charges.

Definition and relation to cgs base units
This repulsion is governed by Coulomb's law, which in the Gaussian-cgs system states:

where F is the force, q and q are the two charges, and r is the distance between the charges. Performing dimensional analysis on Coulomb's law, the dimension of electrical charge in cgs must be [mass]1/2 [length]3/2 [time]−1. (This statement is not true in SI units; see below.) We can be more specific in light of the definition above: Substituting F = 1 dyn, q = q = 1 statC, and r = 1 cm, we get:
 1 statC = g1/2⋅cm3/2⋅s−1
as expected.

Dimensional relation between statcoulomb and coulomb

General incompatibility
Coulomb's law in the Gaussian unit system and the SI are respectively:
 (Gaussian)
 (SI)
Since ε0, the vacuum permittivity, is not dimensionless, the coulomb is not dimensionally equivalent to [mass]1/2 [length]3/2 [time]−1, unlike the statcoulomb. In fact, it is impossible to express the coulomb in terms of mass, length, and time alone.

Consequently, a conversion equation like "1 C = n statC" is misleading: the units on the two sides are not consistent. One cannot freely switch between coulombs and statcoulombs within a formula or equation, as one would freely switch between centimeters and meters. One can, however, find a correspondence between coulombs and statcoulombs in different contexts. As described below, "1 C corresponds to " when describing the charge of objects. Likewise, "1 C corresponds to " when describing an electric displacement field flux.

As a unit of charge
The statcoulomb is defined as follows: If two stationary objects each carry a charge of 1 statC and are 1 cm apart in vacuum, they will electrically repel each other with a force of 1 dyne. From this definition, it is straightforward to find an equivalent charge in coulombs. Using the SI equation
 (SI),

This can also be expressed by the following conversion, which is fully dimensionally consistent, and often useful for switching between SI and cgs formulae:

As a unit of electric displacement field or flux
An electric flux (specifically, a flux of the electric displacement field ) has units of charge: statC in cgs and coulombs in SI. The conversion factor can be derived from Gauss's law:

where

Therefore, the conversion factor for flux is 4π different from the conversion factor for charge:
 (as unit of ).
The dimensionally consistent version is:
 (as unit of )

Units of electrical charge
Centimetre–gram–second system of units